TGFbro is a British YouTube channel created on 2012 by Jay Swingler and Romell Henry. The channel primarily consists of vlogs, challenges, extreme pranks and stunts and music videos. As of July 2022, the channel has over 1.42 billion views and 6.19 million subscribers.

History 
The group was formed in 2012 when Jay Swingler tweeted out who would want to make videos with him and his friend Romell replied saying "I'm on it".

Due to the often extreme nature of the stunts that appear on the channel, they have been subject to multiple controversies and have gained regular national media attention for stunts which include bringing the video game series Grand Theft Auto to life and a live action hide and seek in Birmingham city centre with a £10,000 reward that lead to a police warning.

In 2016, they hosted a show on Channel 4 called Polterguest.

On 25 August 2018, Swingler made his amateur boxing debut on the undercard of KSI vs Logan Paul at Manchester Arena, Manchester, England. He fought and lost against AnEsonGib.

On 15 October 2022, Swingler fought Cherdleys in an exhibition bout as the main event at Sheffield Arena, in Sheffield, England. He defeated Cherdleys via 1st round KO and won the ICB International super-middleweight title.

On 4 March 2023, Swingler fought NichLmao in an exhibition bout as the main event at the Telford International Centre, in Telford, England. He defeated NichLmao via majority decision.

Controversies

I Cemented My Head In A Microwave 
In 2017, the duo uploaded the video "I Cemented My Head In A Microwave", in which spackling paste is used to seal Swingler's head into a microwave. However, the makeshift breathing tube became blocked and attempts to remove Swingler's head from the microwave failed, resulting in the emergency services being called to remove his head to prevent him suffocating.

Following the incident, Swingler was criticised by both the public and the West Midlands Fire Service for "a call-out which might have prevented us from helping someone else in genuine, accidental need". After the story went viral, Jay responded to the controversy, stating that the negative attention did not bother him. He also stated that he was thankful for the help from the firefighters and would be willing to pay a fine.

In 2018, the incident was dramatised in the Fox television series 9-1-1.

Extreme Driving Test 
In March 2020, the duo uploaded the video "Extreme Driving Test", in which the duo, accompanied by a driving instructor, drive recklessly onto grass embankments, crash into parked vehicles, and flip their car in the areas of Telford and Wrekin and Staffordshire.

In a statement, West Mercia Police announced that Swingler, Henry and the instructor faced prosecution under "Operation Snap".

The duo were charged with dangerous driving on 6 March 2020, while the instructor was charged with two counts of aiding and abetting dangerous driving.

On 15 September 2022, Swingler and Henry pleaded guilty to careless driving and were sentenced at Shrewsbury Crown Court. Both were fined £1000 each, ordered to pay £95 court costs, and given five penalty points on their driving licenses. The instructor will be sentenced at a later date for aiding and abetting the driving of a car without due care and attention.

References 

British YouTubers
Jay Swingler
YouTube channels
YouTube channels launched in 2012
YouTube controversies